The Copa San Cristóbal (formerly known as Copa Fila and Copa Topper for sponsorship reasons) is a tennis tournament held in Buenos Aires, Argentina, since 2010. The event is part of the ATP Challenger Tour and is played on outdoor red clay courts.

Past finals

Singles

Doubles

External links 

ITF search

 
2010 establishments in Argentina
Copa Topper
Clay court tennis tournaments
Recurring sporting events established in 2010
Sports competitions in Buenos Aires
Tennis tournaments in Argentina